Otitoma xantholineata is a species of sea snail, a marine gastropod mollusk in the family Pseudomelatomidae, the turrids and allies.

Description
The length of the shell varies between 7 mm and 9 mm.

Distribution
This marine species occurs off the Fiji Islands.

References

 Morassi M., Nappo A. & Bonfitto A. (2017). New species of the genus Otitoma Jousseaume, 1898 (Pseudomelatomidae, Conoidea) from the Western Pacific Ocean. European Journal of Taxonomy. 304: 1-30

External links
 Gastropods.com: Otitoma xantholineata

xantholineata
Gastropods described in 2017